A. gentilis may refer to:

Acarolella gentilis, a moth species
Accipiter gentilis, the northern goshawk, a bird species
Adaina gentilis, a moth species
Aureoboletus gentilis, a fungus species
Austroeme gentilis, a beetle species